John William Tranter Spinks,  (January 1, 1908 – March 27, 1997) was the President of the University of Saskatchewan from 1960 to 1975.

Biography
Born in Norfolk, England he received a BSc (1928) and his doctor of philosophy degree (Ph.D.) in chemistry (1930) from King's College London.

He emigrated to Canada in 1930 to join the chemistry faculty of the University of Saskatchewan as an assistant professor and was promoted to professor in 1938, head of the Department of Chemistry in 1948, and dean of the college of Graduate Studies in 1949. He was appointed President in 1960. During his tenure, the university grew from 4,500 to 13,500 full-time students. He spent the 1933-34 academic year at the University of Darmstadt, Germany, where he first met Dr. Gerhard Herzberg and helped him emigrate to Canada.

During World War II, he developed search and rescue procedures for missing aircraft and was appointed MBE. After the war, he pioneered the use of radioactive isotopes in agricultural and chemical research. He married Mary Strelioff in 1939. He died in Saskatoon in 1997.

The University of Saskatchewan open source computer labs were named the Spinks Labs.

Honours
 In 1970 he was appointed a Companion of the Order of Canada. 
 In 1982 he was inducted into the Saskatchewan Agricultural Hall of Fame
 In 1985 he was named Saskatoon's Citizen of the Year.
 In 1996 he was awarded the Saskatchewan Order of Merit.

References
 John William Tranter Spinks at The Canadian Encyclopedia
 John William Tranter Spinks at The Encyclopedia of Saskatchewan
 University of Saskatchewan Honorary Degree citation

1908 births
1997 deaths
Alumni of King's College London
British chemists
Companions of the Order of Canada
Canadian Members of the Order of the British Empire
Members of the Saskatchewan Order of Merit
People from Norfolk
Presidents of the University of Saskatchewan
Academic staff of Technische Universität Darmstadt
British emigrants to Canada